Gallmersgarten is a municipality in the district of Neustadt (Aisch)-Bad Windsheim in Bavaria in Germany.

Mayor
1996–2020: Emil Kötzel
since 2020: Michael Schlehlein

References

Neustadt (Aisch)-Bad Windsheim